Ta Pon is a khum (commune) of Sangkae District in Battambang Province in north-western Cambodia.

Villages

 Boeng Tuem
 Svay Sa
 Samdach
 Basaet
 Ta Pon

References

Communes of Battambang province
Sangkae District